The Medulli (Gaulish: Medulloi) were a Gallic tribe dwelling in the upper valley of Maurienne, around present-day Modane (Savoie), during the Iron Age and Roman period.

Name 
They are mentioned as Medullorum by Vitruvius (late 1st c. BC), Méd(o)ulloi (Μέδ<ο>υλλοι) by Strabo (early 1st c. AD), Medulli by Pliny (1st c. AD), and as Medoúllous (Μεδούλλους) by Ptolemy (2nd c. AD).

The ethnonym Medulli is a latinized form of Gaulish Medulloi. It is generally derived from the Celtic root medu-, meaning 'mead, alcoholic drink' (cf. Olr. mid, MW. medd, OBret. medot), and thus may be translated as 'those who drink mead'. This interpretation is encouraged by the mention, in Vitruvius' De architetura, of a "kind of water" (genus aquae) drunk by the Medulli. Alternatively, Javier de Hoz has proposed to glose the name as 'those who lived in the middle', or 'in the border woods', by connecting it to the root *medhi/u- ('middle').

Geography 
The Medulli dwelled in the upper Maurienne valley, along the upper course of the Arc river, near the modern town of Modane (Amonada). Their territory was located east of the Graioceli (themselves east of the Vocontii), north of the Brigianii and Quariates, west of the Segusini, and south of the Ceutrones (themselves south of the Allobroges).

They belonged to the tribes governed by Cottius in Alpes Taurinae and were later integrated into the province of Alpes Cottiae.

History 
They are mentioned by Pliny the Elder as one of the Alpine tribes conquered by Rome in 16–15 BC, and whose name was engraved on the Tropaeum Alpium. They also appear on the Arch of Susa, erected by Cottius in 9–8 BC.

According to Vitruvius, they were particularly prone to suffer from goitre.

See also
 Ceutrones
 Graioceli
 Segusini

References

Primary sources

Bibliography

Further reading 
 L. Comby 1977, Histoire des Savoyards, Nathan

Historical Celtic peoples
Gauls
Tribes of pre-Roman Gaul
History of Savoy